A. lepidus may refer to:

 Acusilas lepidus, an orb-weaver spider species found in Myanmar
 Argyrodes lepidus, a tangle web spider species

See also
 Lepidus (disambiguation)